Apocalypse, Girl (stylized as Apocalypse, girl) is the fifth studio album by Norwegian musician Jenny Hval, released on June 9, 2015 through Sacred Bones and Su Tissue Records.

Music videos have been made for "That Battle Is Over", "Sabbath" and "Take Care of Yourself".

Critical reception

At Metacritic, which assigns a normalized rating out of 100 to reviews from mainstream publications, the album received an average score of 79, based on 20 reviews, indicating "generally favorable reviews". Tiny Mix Tapes said "both her songs and her subject matter hold back from shocking the listener by virtue of their content, and yet they make a startling impact—creating a headspace that leads to nowhere in the same moment that it paves the way to salvation." The Guardian wrote: "The album wrestles with many of the same ideas [as Innocence Is Kinky], set against an erotic sonic futurescape of spoken word, warped choirs, sci-fi electronics and her typically pillow-soft vocals.... It’s provocative, but these are ideas rarely heard in pop, which makes it all the more compelling." Consequence of Sound described the album as "an understated mesh of free jazz and artful improvisation, guiding us out of the nightmare capitalism has dreamed for us and into sexual liberation and individual rebirth." Rolling Stone said "Apocalypse, girl is a shift toward orchestral pop after the noisy rock of 2013's Innocence Is Kinky, but Hval loses none of her avant-garde inclinations in the process." Pitchfork said: "Like all of her best work, it finds new ways to provoke, and new parts of your brain to light up."

Accolades

Track listing

Notes
 "Kingsize" quotes and translated the poem "En Stor Sten af en Lille sten at Være" by Mette Moestrup.

Personnel
Credits adapted from the liner notes of Apocalypse, Girl.

 Jenny Hval – vocals, effects, keyboards, arrangements, recording
 Håvard Volden – guitar, bass
 Kyrre Laastad – drums
 Øystein Moen – synths, mellotron
 Okkyung Lee – cello
 Thor Harris – various mallets, percussion
 Rhodri Davies – harp
 Lara Myrvoll – beats 
 Syster Alma – sampling
 Lasse Marhaug – production, mixing, arrangements, recording
 Rob Halverson – additional recording
 Sam Grant – additional recording
 Marcus Schmickler – mastering
 Zia Anger – photography
 Lisbeth Vogler – cover

Charts

References

2015 albums
Sacred Bones Records albums
Jenny Hval albums